The Rural Municipality of Victoria is located in south-central Manitoba, north-east of Glenboro. The RM was established in 1902 and named for Queen Victoria. In its westernmost part, the RM contains parts of Manitoba's Spruce Woods Provincial Forest and Spruce Woods Provincial Park.

Communities 
 Cypress River
 Holland
 Landseer

Demographics 

See also 
 Monarchy in Manitoba

References 

 Geographic Names of Manitoba (pg. 281–282) - the Millennium Bureau of Canada

External links 

Victoria